Matteo Corradini (born April 15, 1975, Borgonovo Val Tidone) is an Italian writer and hebraist.

His books are published by Rizzoli. As author of many books for children and adults, he also holds workshops on the teaching of the memory of the Shoah in Italy and abroad. As hebraist, he has been researching the Terezin concentration camp since 2002. Since then he has been back to the ghetto more than once a year. 
He is curator of the literary festival Scrittorincittà, in Cuneo (Italy), and contributor to Italian newspapers Avvenire and Popotus. He has held courses both in private universities (at the Università Cattolica del Sacro Cuore) and in state universities (at the Politecnico di Milano). He has been a theatre director and has organized musical readings and conferences.

Matteo Corradini’s research on the topic of the Terezin ghetto allowed him to discover original musical instruments and objects from Terezin that have since been put to use by the Pavel Zalud Quartet (founded by Corradini in 2013), and by the Pavel Zalud Orchestra (founded in 2015). Both ensembles play music composed in Terezin during the war.  Corradini was the author of the speech read by Sir Ben Kingsley on January 27, 2015, during the ceremony held at Terezin to mark International Holocaust Memorial Day and 70 years since the liberation of Auschwitz.

In recent years, Corradini has worked on events and shows with Abraham Yehoshua, Uri Orlev, Inge Auerbacher, Melvin Burgess, Assaf Gavron...

Since 2017 he is the new Italian curator of Anne Frank's "Diary of a young girl" (published in Italy by Rizzoli). On October 26, 2017, he read some words by Anne Frank's Diary before a soccer match (Juventus FC - Spal), fighting racism and anti-semitism with the Italian Soccer Federation.

In 2018 he curated the Italian edition of Inge Auerbacher's book of memories (I am a star). In 2018, he won the "Premio Andersen" in Italy, for his work about the remembrance of the Shoah. In the same year, his novel "Im Ghetto gibt es keine Schmetterlinge" was chosen by Jugend-Literatur-Jury as one of the best novels published in Germany during the last year.

Books 
 Luci nella Shoah (2021, DeAgostini)
 Se la notte ha cuore (2020, Bompiani)
 Solo una parola (2019, Rizzoli)
 Fu Stella (2019, Lapis)
 Il profumo dell'Eden (2018, Giuntina)
 Inge Auerbacher, Io sono una stella - a cura di Matteo Corradini (Bompiani 2018)
 Im Ghetto gibt es keine Schmetterlinge (2017, CBJ Verlag - RandomHouse)
 Alfabeto ebraico - new edition (2017, Salani)
 La pioggia porterà le violette di maggio (2017, Lapis)
 Anne Frank, Diario - a cura di Matteo Corradini, traduzione di Dafna Fiano (BUR Biblioteca Universale Rizzoli, Ragazzi, 2017)
 Anne Frank, Diario - a cura di Matteo Corradini, traduzione di Dafna Fiano, prefazione di Sami Modiano (BUR Biblioteca Universale Rizzoli, Grandi Classici, 2017)
 Siamo partiti cantando - Etty Hillesum, un treno, dieci canzoni (2016, RueBallu)
 Improvviso scherzo notturno - Un viaggio nella musica di Fryderyk Chopin (2015, RueBallu)
 Annalilla' (2014, Rizzoli)
 La pioggia porterà le violette di maggio (2014, Einaudi Scuola)
 La repubblica delle farfalle (2013, Rizzoli)
 Alfabeto ebraico'' (2012, Salani)

References

The Holocaust
21st-century Italian novelists
Italian children's writers
Italian male novelists
1975 births
Living people